The Pure-J Openweight Championship is a women's professional wrestling championship owned by the Pure-J promotion. The championship, which is situated at the top of Pure-J's championship hierarchy, was introduced on October 9, 2017, when Hanako Nakamori defeated Manami Katsu in the finals of a 12-woman tournament to become the inaugural champion. Like most professional wrestling championships, the title is won as a result of a scripted match. 

There have been a total of thirteen reigns shared between six different wrestlers. Hanako Nakamori is the current champion in her fifth reign.

Reigns

Combined reigns 

Footnotes

References

External links 
 Pure-J's official website

Openweight wrestling championships
Women's professional wrestling championships